Wujing may refer to:

 Five Classics (五經), five classic Chinese books
 Sha Wujing (沙悟淨), one of the three helpers of Xuánzàng in the classic Chinese novel Journey to the West
 Wujing Zongyao (武經總要, Chinese military compendium written in 1044 AD, during the Northern Song Dynasty
 People's Armed Police (武警), a paramilitary force of the People's Republic of China
 Wujing, Fufeng County, town in Fufeng County, Baoji, Shaanxi
 Wujing, Nanxiong (乌迳镇), town in Guangdong
 Wujing, Linqu County (五井镇), town in Shandong
 Wujing, Shanghai (吴泾镇), town in Minhang District
 "Wujing" (The Blacklist), 2013 episode of TV series The Blacklist

See also
Wu Jing (disambiguation)
Wu Ching (disambiguation)